The 1967 Monegasque municipal elections were held on 25 February and 3 March to elect the 15 members of the Communal Council of Monaco.

Electoral system
The 15 councillors were elected for a four-year period in a single multi-member constituency using plurality-at-large voting with a two-round system. A majority of the votes was required to be elected. The second round would have been held one week after the first round.
The Mayor of Monaco was elected by the councillors after the election.

Results

Summary 

Following the election, Robert Boisson was reelected mayor.

Full results

First round

Second round

References

1967
Monaco
Municipal election
February 1967 events in Europe
March 1967 events in Europe